Alice Peña Bulos ( Peña; March 31, 1930 – October 21, 2016) was a Filipino American professor, civil rights leader, and leader of the Asian American movement.  She was a member of the Democratic Party and represented California in five Democratic National Conventions.

Academia

Alice Bulos attended the University of Santo Tomas in Manila, Philippines in 1948, graduating with a BA and MA in Social and Behavioral Sciences. She began her professional career as Professor of Sociology at the University of Santo Tomas and eventually became the Chairman of the Department of Sociology, teaching from 1951 to 1971 at the University of Santo Tomas.

Public service

Bulos served as Commissioner for the San Mateo County Commission on the Status of Women and the Health Plan of San Mateo County. She has served as a board member for numerous community organizations and agencies. From 1993 to 2000, she served the Federal Council on Aging, as an appointee of President Bill Clinton. In 2006, she was honored as the Woman of the Year for the 19th Assembly District of California for actively pushing for the address of several issues such as domestic violence, health care, and the US residency application process. She has been honored as Women Warrior of the Year by the Pacific Asian American Women Bay area Coalition and has been inducted into the San Mateo County Women's Hall of Fame.

She was dubbed as "Grand Dame of Filipino–American Politics" by the media.

She was founding president of the Thomasians USA, a University of Santo Tomas alumni organization in the United States, which she lead until her death in 2016.

Legacy
A library in South San Francisco, California  and a stretch of the California State Route 35 are named in her honor. California Assemblyman Phil Ting sponsored the bill to rename the highway after Bulos.  A community center in South San Francisco was also renamed in her honor.

References

American trade union leaders
American women sociologists
American sociologists
Filipino emigrants to the United States
People from Nueva Ecija
United Farm Workers people
1930 births
2016 deaths
People from California
People from South San Francisco, California
Filipino sociologists
Filipino women sociologists
Filipino women academics
University of Santo Tomas alumni
Academic staff of the University of Santo Tomas